Geoff Harden (8 July 1943 – 4 September 2006) was a journalist, broadcaster, recording engineer and folk music promoter. Born in Kent, England, Harden moved to Belfast, Northern Ireland in 1966. He became well known on the music scene in Belfast after setting up the Sunflower Folk Club in Corporation Street, and consequently for his work as a folk music columnist in The News Letter and as a presenter on and contributor to numerous local radio stations.

References
 

1943 births
2006 deaths
People from Kent
British male journalists